The LOS40 Music Awards 2007 were held at the Palacio de Deportes de la Comunidad de Madrid on December 17, 2007 and were hosted by Tony Aguilar.

Awards

Live performances

Main show
Tokio Hotel — "Monsoon"
El Sueño de Morfeo — "Demasiado Tarde"
Nek and El Sueño de Morfeo — "Para Ti Sería"
Chenoa — "Todo Irá Bien"
Pereza — "Estrella Polar"
Natasha Bedingfield — "Unwritten"
Conchita — "Nada Que Perder"
Motel — "Dime Ven"

Concerts
Hombres G
La Quinta Estación
Juanes (featuring Nelly Furtado)

References

2007 music awards
Los Premios 40 Principales
2007 in Spanish music